Chandani Bhagwanani is an Indian television actress. She made her debut with Kohi Apna Sa and went on to replace Hansika Motwani in Kyunki Saas Bhi Kabhi Bahu Thi. She is best known for her roles of Amita in Sony TV's serial Amita Ka Amit  and Sanjana in Tum Hi Ho Bandhu Sakha Tumhi on Zee TV. She was seen in negative roles in Roop - Mard Ka Naya Swaroop as Palak and Dr. Asha in Sanjivani . She was last seen in the role of Pallavi in StarPlus' popular show Imlie.

Television

Filmography

References

Indian television actresses
Living people
Year of birth missing (living people)
Actresses in Hindi television
21st-century Indian actresses